Đồng Văn station (Vietnamese: Ga Đồng Văn) is a railway station on the North–South railway in Duy Tiên, Hà Nam, Vietnam.

References 

Railway stations in Vietnam